Frederick Henry Bradley,  (27 September 1876 – 10 March 1943) was a British Army officer and an English recipient of the Victoria Cross, the highest award for gallantry in the face of the enemy that can be awarded to British and Commonwealth forces.

He was 24 years old, and a driver in the 69th Battery, Royal Field Artillery during the Second Boer War when the following deed took place at Itala, South Africa for which he was awarded the VC:

References

External links
 Anglo-Boer War

1876 births
1943 deaths
British Army personnel of the Second Boer War
British Army personnel of World War I
British Army recipients of the Victoria Cross
British recipients of the Victoria Cross
People from the London Borough of Hackney
Royal Artillery officers
Royal Artillery soldiers
Second Boer War recipients of the Victoria Cross
South African Army officers
South African military personnel of World War I